The Replot Bridge is a cable-stayed tuftform bridge connecting the island of Replot with the mainland in Korsholm, near Vaasa, Finland.

The bridge was inaugurated 27 August 1997 by the president of Finland Martti Ahtisaari.

External links

Municipality of Korsholm – Replot bridge
The Replot Bridge Webcam
Webcam at Berny's
Berny's Weather Station, Replotbridge, Finland

Cable-stayed bridges in Finland
Bridges completed in 1997
Korsholm
Buildings and structures in Ostrobothnia (region)